Payoyo may refer to:
The demonym for Villaluenga del Rosario, Spain
Payoyo cheese
Payoya goat